Parella is a municipality in the Metropolitan City of Turin in the Italian region Piedmont.

Parella may also refer to:

 Colleretto Parella, comune  in the Metropolitan City of Turin in the Italian region Piedmont
 Parella, Portuguese name for the Parel area of Mumbai
 Tony Parella, president and CEO of the Sportscar Vintage Racing Association

See also 

 Barella
 Parel (disambiguation)